The 2018 Missouri State Bears football team represented Missouri State University in the 2018 NCAA Division I FCS football season. They were led by fourth-year head coach Dave Steckel and played their home games at the Robert W. Plaster Stadium. They were a member of the Missouri Valley Football Conference. They finished the season 4–7, 2–6 in MVFC play to finish in ninth place.

Previous season
The Bears finished the 2017 season 3–8, 2–6 in MVFC play to finish in a tie for eighth place.

Preseason

Preseason MVFC poll
The MVFC released their preseason poll on July 29, 2018, with the Bears predicted to finish in ninth place.

Preseason All-MVFC Teams
The Bears placed three players on the preseason all-MVFC teams.

Offense

2nd team

Marquis Prophete – OL

Defense

1st team

Angelo Garbut – LB

2nd team

Darius Joseph – DB

Schedule

Game summaries

at Oklahoma State

Lincoln (MO)

Northern Arizona

Illinois State

at South Dakota

at Indiana State

Western Illinois

Southern Illinois

at South Dakota State

North Dakota State

at Northern Iowa

Ranking movements

References

Missouri State
Missouri State Bears football seasons
Missouri State Bears football